Systaspes is a genus of skippers in the family Hesperiidae. It is monotypic, being represented by the single species, Systaspes corrosus.

References

Natural History Museum Lepidoptera genus database

Hesperiidae
Hesperiidae genera